The Mark VII depth charge was the standard British depth charge for the first three years of World War II

Development

The Mark VII depth charge most likely has its roots in British depth charges developed and used during World War I.

Service 
The Mark VII depth charge was the primary British anti-submarine weapon until 1944 when the anti-submarine projectile launchers the Hedgehog spigot mortar and Squid three-barrelled mortar introduced in 1943 and 1944 proved more effective. In 1939 this was the only anti-submarine weapon available to British surface ships.

Variants 

Mark VII heavy
Introduced in 1940. A  cast iron weight was attached to increase sinking rate. 

Mark VII Airborne depth charge 
Introduced in 1941, this was the Mark VII depth charge adapted for use from aircraft. Had nose and tail fairings that broke off when it hit the water.

References

Depth_charges 
World_War_II_naval_weapons_of_the_United_Kingdom